Te Whanganui-a-Tara is the Māori name for Wellington Harbour. The term is also used to refer to the city of Wellington which lies on the shores of the harbour. Te Whanganui-a-Tara translates as "the great harbour of Tara", named for Tara, a son of Polynesian explorer Whatonga, whose descendants lived in the area.

In Māori tradition, Te Whanganui-a-Tara is said to have been first discovered by Kupe, who visited in the 10th century. A number of place names in the area commemorate Kupe, such as Te Tangihanga o Kupe or Te Raranga o Kupe (Barrett Reef), and Te Aroaro o Kupe or Te Ure o Kupe (Steeple Rock). Kupe also named two islands in the harbour, Mākaro (Ward Island) and Matiu (Somes Island). However, it is the rangatira Tara who is remembered in the names of both the city and the first iwi (tribe) to settle there permanently, Ngāi Tara.

Another name for the region is "Te Upoko o te Ika a Māui", which means "the head of Māui’s fish". According to Māori legend, a giant fish was hooked and pulled to the surface by Polynesian navigator Māui and the fish turned into land which became the North Island. The older name is still used in some circumstances for the city or the region, such as the former Māori name of Victoria University of Wellington, which was Te Whare Wānanga o te Ūpoko o te Ika a Māui until 2018.

Another Māori name for Wellington is Pōneke. It is commonly held that Pōneke is a phonetic Māori transliteration of "Port Nick", short for "Port Nicholson". An alternative possible etymology for  comes from a shortening of the phrase , meaning "the journey into the night", referring to the exodus of Te Āti Awa after they were displaced from the Wellington area by the first Europeans.

Legend of Whanganui-a-Tara
According to legend, the harbour of Te Whanganui-a-Tara was created by two taniwha (nature guardian spirits), Whātaitai (or Hataitai) and Ngake. Whataitai lived in the north of the lake where the harbour now is, and was gentle. Ngake, who lived further south, was more violent. Ngake could hear the waters of Raukawa Moana (Cook Strait) pounding to the south, and decided to escape the lake to get to it. He went to the north of the lake to build up his speed for the attempt, then headed off rapidly towards the south. Ngake crashed into and through the rocks at Seatoun and headed out into the Strait. This was seen by Whataitai, who tried to follow Ngake out of the new entrance. The water was now running out of the lake, however, and Whataitai became stranded in the shallows. He stayed there for many generations before being lifted high onto the land by a great earthquake. The soul of  Whataitai left him in the form of a bird, Te Keo. It flew high above the harbour and wept for the taniwha, whose body was lifted high onto the hills close to the harbour entrance. To this day, Mount Victoria is known to Māori as Tangi Te Keo, "The weeping of Te Keo", and the suburb on the hills immediately below it is named Hataitai.

References

External links
Taniwha legend

Wellington Harbour
Māori
Māori mythology
New Zealand legends
Māori words and phrases